The 2003–04 season was East Bengal Football Club's 8th season in the National Football League, and also marked the club's 84th season. East Bengal successfully defended their league title from the previous season, competing in the 2003-04 NFL. They have also won the 2003 Calcutta Football League and the 2003 ASEAN Club Championship. They became runners-up in the 2003 Super Cup, 2003 Durand Cup and 2003 IFA Shield.

First-team squad
East Bengal FC squad for the 2003–04 season.

 (c)

Coach:  Subhash Bhowmick
Physical trainer:  Kevin Jackson
Team doctor: Dr. S R Dasgupta
Team manager: Swapan Ball

Stadiums
Kingfisher East Bengal F.C. have been using both the Salt Lake Stadium and the East Bengal Ground sense Salt Lake Stadium opened in 1984. As of today the Salt Lake Stadium is used for East Bengal's I-League, AFC Cup, and Federation Cup games. The East Bengal Ground is used for the Calcutta Football League matches.

Competitions

Overall

Matches

Calcutta Football League

ASEAN Club Championship

Federation Cup

IFA Shield

Durand Cup

Super Cup

National Football League

Statistics

Top Scorers

Sponsors
Main Sponsor: Kingfisher (Parent Company United Breweries Group is 50% stake holder in the club).

References

East Bengal Club seasons